Patrick Joseph McGuigan (8 December 1939 – 17 March 2014), known as Paddy Joe McGuigan, was an Irish traditional musician and songwriter who played for some years with The Barleycorn folk group. He wrote a number of well-known Irish rebel songs, including "The Men Behind the Wire", "The Boys of the Old Brigade", "Irish Soldier Laddie", "Freedom Walk" and "Bring Them Home".

McGuigan, a native of Belfast, wrote "The Men Behind the Wire" in the aftermath of internment in Northern Ireland. The song describes raids by British soldiers and the "men behind the wire" refers to those held without charge or trial at Long Kesh prison camp, Magilligan prison camp and on board the Maidstone Prison Ship. McGuigan himself was picked up in a later round of internment.

McGuigan released his only solo album with Dolphin Records (DOLM 5012) in 1975, My Country, My Songs and Me. Along with Dermot O'Brien, he also produced the album, The Price Of Justice, featuring Kathleen Largey of the Flying Column Music Group.

McGuigan died on 17 March 2014 following a short illness.

References

External links

1939 births
2014 deaths
Irish folk musicians
Irish songwriters
Musicians from Belfast